Madness (German:Wahnsinn) is a 1919 German silent horror film directed by Conrad Veidt and starring Veidt, Reinhold Schünzel and Grit Hegesa. The film's art direction was by Willi Herrmann.

After becoming a successful actor, Veidt formed his own production company called Veidtfilme and decided to try his hand at directing movies. Madness was one of two films directed by Veidt during his career, the other being the 1920 Die Nacht auf Goldenhall.  Both films are lost today. The films had little impact at the box office. After 1920, Veidt returned exclusively to acting.

The screenplay of Madness was adapted from an obscure novel written by Kurt Muenzer.

Plot
A wealthy banker (Veidt) is given a key to a lost trunk by a Gypsy, who tells him that the trunk's contents will lead him either to happiness or death. He becomes obsessed with finding the trunk, and his vain search leads him to a mental breakdown.

Cast
 Conrad Veidt as Bankier Lorenzen 
 Reinhold Schünzel as Jörges 
 Grit Hegesa as Marion Cavello 
 Gussy Holl as Mädchen aus dem Althändler Laden

References

Bibliography
 Hutchings, Peter. The A to Z of Horror Cinema. Scarecrow Press, 2009.

External links

1919 films
1919 horror films
Lost German films
Films of the Weimar Republic
German silent feature films
German horror films
Films directed by Conrad Veidt
German black-and-white films
Silent horror films
1910s German films